Exit is the first single by American hip hop artist Cupcakke off her third studio album Ephorize. It was released February 15, 2018 via TuneCore.

Background
The rapper announced that a single would be coming out on September 15, 2017. She released the title and the cover art on Twitter.

Composition
Billboard wrote that "the track starts off with a breezy beat, but the Chicago-based rapper changes the tone as soon as she bursts in, showing her cheating man the door." "Against a shimmering trop-bop beat, CupcakKe lists off all of her cheating boyfriend's crimes as she puts his stuff in a Hefty : Go and lie, say you left me to one of your besties/ Acting like you can't get replaced, you feeling like Wesley/ Playing Pokémon, the way these n***as out tryna catch me. It's everything we've come to love about CupcaKke – empowering, hard-hitting, razor sharp, and real as fuck." described Paper. The Nation asked "Who hasn’t felt a version of this?... As she raps in the second verse of 'Exit': My mind telling me go but my heart telling me stay / 30 seconds I love you, the other 30 I hate / 2 could play the game but lemme show you my way / 365 contacts, new number every day."

Promotion
A music video for "Exit" was released October 13, 2017.

Critical reception
Highsnobiety commented that the song is "calling out an unfaithful ex, the Chicago rapper goes off and refuses to accept defeat." The Fader stated that "on the sweet diss track, the Chicago rapper goes off on an unfaithful ex...Even though CupcakKe was betrayed by her lover, she will not accept defeat when it comes to playing these games of the heart."  Stereogum called it "a shuffling and glorious takedown track addressed to a cheating ex that gets in a ton of digs but also manages to be blisteringly introspective." Kristen Stegmoeller of Paper describes it as a "song about reading your cheating ex for filth before kicking him out of your place." To XXL, "Exit" shows that Harris has "got the crossover hit-making capabilities of Nicki Minaj or Ariana Grande." The Nation explained the song captures "that particular kind of pain that comes with realizing that something about your relationship is off, has gone suddenly sour—and also realizing that it’s neither your fault nor something you can control. Harris confronts those feelings of anger and frustration, acknowledging why they can be particularly pernicious while understanding just how magnetic the person who betrayed you can still be."

References

2017 singles
Cupcakke songs
2017 songs